Kalkalia Union is a union parishad under Jagannathpur Upazila of Sunamganj District in the division of Sylhet, Bangladesh. It has an area of 21 square kilometres and a population of 38,000.

Geography 
Kolkolia Union is located at the north-west of Jagannathpur Upazila. It shares borders with Patli Union and Jagannathpur Municipality in the East, Derai Upazila in the west, Dakshin Sunamganj and Chhatak in the north and Chilaura-Haldipur Union in the south.
It has an area of 21 square kilometres.

Demography 
Kolkolia Union has a population of 38,000.

Administration 
Kolkolia constitutes the no. 1 union council of Jagannathpur Upazila. It has 9 wards, 34 mauzas, and 39 villages.

References

Populated places in Sunamganj District
Unions of Jagannathpur Upazila